Hacıbektaş, formerly Karahöyük, is a town and district of Nevşehir Province in the Central Anatolia region of Turkey. According to 2000 census, population of the district is 11,929 of which 5,169 live in the town of Hacıbektaş. The town is named after Haji Bektash Veli, a 13th-century Sufi saint who founded the Bektashi Order.

History
W. M. Ramsay identified the town as one of the possible locations of Doara, an ancient town and bishopric. Modern scholars place it elsewhere. From 1867 until 1922, Hacıbektaş was part of Angora vilayet.

For centuries, Hacıbektaş has served as the international headquarters of the Bektashi Order until Atatürk outlawed all dervish orders in 1925. In 1930, the Bektashi Order officially set up its new headquarters in Tirana, Albania.

Notable residents
Haji Bektash Veli, the founder of the Bektashi order, lived in the area in the 14th century and is commemorated by the town's current name and in an annual festival. His tomb known as the Hajibektash complex is located near the center of town in his former monastery, now a museum, and is a site of pilgrimage for Alevi and Bektashi from throughout Turkey and the world.

Villages
 

Köşektaş

See also
 Sufism
 Bektashism

Notes

References

External links
 District governor's official website 
 District municipality's official website 
 Map of Hacıbektaş district 
 Administrative map of Hacıbektaş district Website

Towns in Turkey
Islam in Turkey
Populated places in Nevşehir Province
Districts of Nevşehir Province